Rolando Villazón Mauleón (born 22 February 1972) is a Mexican operatic tenor, stage director, author, radio and television personality and artistic director. He now lives in France, and in 2007 became a French citizen.

Villazón has published several books, including the novels Malabares and Paladas de sombra contra la oscuridad which have been translated into French and German. He is a member of the Collège de 'Pataphysique in Paris.

Early life
He was raised in Fuentes de Satélite, a suburban area of Greater Mexico City, Mexico. In an interview for Mexican television, Villazón told the story of how he was discovered as a tenor. He said that one day, as he was getting out of the shower in his apartment in Mexico City, somebody came knocking on his door; it was baritone Arturo Nieto, a friend of his neighbour, who had heard him singing while in the shower. He told Rolando he had an amazing voice and invited him to his music academy to develop his voice; it was there that Villazón fell in love with opera.

Career

Late 1990s and early 2000s 

He came to international attention in 1999 when he won second prize in Plácido Domingo's Operalia competition (losing to Bulgarian bass Orlin Anastassov), as well as the first Zarzuela prize and the audience prize. The same year he sang for the first time in Italy as des Grieux in Manon at the Teatro Carlo Felice in Genoa. In 2000 he appeared for the first time at the Berlin State Opera, as Macduff in Macbeth. Over the years he has presented many of his best roles there, among them José in Carmen and des Grieux in Manon.

In Munich in 2000 he sang Rodolfo in La bohème and in 2002 in Los Angeles, Rinuccio in Gianni Schicchi. In 2003 he sang Rodolfo at the Glyndebourne Festival Opera in England. He also enjoyed success in the title role of Les Contes d'Hoffmann at London's Royal Opera House. The following year he appeared as Alfredo in La traviata at the Metropolitan Opera, New York, and in 2005, both at St. Petersburg and the Salzburg Festival.

2005–2010
Rolando Villazón performed regularly in the world's most important opera houses and in concert. In August 2005, he sang a highly regarded Alfredo in Verdi's La traviata at the Salzburg Festival, conducted by Carlo Rizzi, directed by Willy Decker. Co-starring was Anna Netrebko as Violetta. They also appeared together in a performance of Donizetti's L'elisir d'amore at the Vienna State Opera which was released on DVD. He starred alongside Netrebko and Domingo in globally televised concerts from Berlin's Waldbühne and Vienna's Schönbrunn Palace in 2006 and 2008.

Vocal surgery and the return to the stage 

Between 2007 and 2009, Villazón cancelled many of his scheduled engagements in order to diagnose and remedy a persistent vocal issue. In May 2009, Rolando Villazón announced that he had to undergo surgery in order to remove a congenital cyst in one of his vocal cords.

After completing his rehabilitation, he returned to the stage in March 2010 singing Nemorino in L'elisir d'amore at the Vienna State Opera in March 2010, and then embarked on a series of recitals.  In December 2012, he appeared as Rodolfo in La bohème at London's Royal Opera House, a role he first sang there in 2005.

Beginning in 2010, Villazón has undertaken a number of Mozart tenor roles both in concert and in operatic performances, notably Don Ottavio in Mozart's Don Giovanni at the Festspiel Baden-Baden, the Royal Opera House and the Staatsoper Berlin, the role of Alessandro in Mozart's Il re pastore under William Christie at Zürich Opera House and the Salzburg Festival and Lucio Silla at the Salzburg Festival. His first all-Mozart solo album featuring the composer's concert arias for tenor was released in January 2014.

2015 - today 
Rolando Villazón continues to perform on the world's leading stages and has added numerous diverse roles to his repertoire in recent years. In 2016, he made his debut in Bohuslav Martinů's opera "Juliette ou la clé des songes" in a new production conducted by Daniel Barenboim at the Berlin State Opera. That year also sang his first highly acclaimed L'Orfeo, a role he sings in new productions at Semperoper Dresden and Santa Fe Opera in 2023.

In 2017, he sang his first Ulisse in Claudio Monteverdi's opera Il ritorno d'Ulisse in patria in Paris. He made a further role debut as Pelléas in Claude Debussy's opera Pelléas et Mélisande (opera) in 2018, again conducted by Barenboim. In 2021, he returned to New York's Metropolitan Opera as Papageno. In 2022, Rolando Villazón made his internationally acclaimed debut as Loge in Richard Wagner's Das Rheingold at Berlin State Opera in a new production by Dmitri Tcherniakov and conducted by Christian Thielemann.

In 2018, Rolando Villazón was named artistic director of the Mozartwoche festival and later the International Mozarteum Foundation. His contract has been extended until 2028.

Stage Direction 
He made his debut as a stage director with a new production of Werther at the Opéra de Lyon in January 2011. Since then, he has directed L'elisir d'amore at Festspielhaus Baden-Baden (2012) and Oper Leipzig (2019), Viva la Mamma at Vienna Volksoper (2015), La rondine at Deutsche Oper Berlin (2015), La traviata at Festspielhaus Baden-Baden (2015), Die Fledermaus at Deutsche Oper Berlin (2018), La sonnambula at Théâtre des Champs-Élysées (2021) and The Barber of Seville at the Salzburg Festival (2022).

Recording Career and Television Appearances 
In addition to his appearances on the opera stage, he maintains an active recording career. He has recorded four solo CDs with Virgin Classics and is additionally featured, along with Patrizia Ciofi and Topi Lehtipuu, on the recording of Il combattimento di Tancredi e Clorinda by Claudio Monteverdi, conducted by Emmanuelle Haïm. An album of zarzuelas (Gitano, Virgin Classics) conducted by Plácido Domingo, was released in Spring 2007. The U.S. version of his album Viva Villazón (Virgin Classics) was released in September 2007. Villazón sang "La Prima Luce" on the 2014 Yanni/Plácido Domingo/Ric Wake collaboration album Inspirato.

In 2007, Villazón switched his recording company and signed an exclusive long-term contract with Deutsche Grammophon. For DG, Rolando Villazón has recorded over 20 CDs and DVDs so far which have received numerous prizes. His discography includes leading roles in complete recordings of six operas by Wolfgang Amadeus Mozart, conducted by Yannick Nézet-Séguin.

In early 2010 he was a mentor and judge in the ITV show Popstar to Operastar. From 2012 - 2015, he was the host of the German Echo Klassik awards. Since 2011, he has hosted his own programme on Arte TV, featuring the "Stars of tomorrow". He presents a daily show on Germany's Klassik Radio and hosted a show on France's Radio Classique.

Discography
Romeo y Julieta CD (2002), Radio Televisión Española
Der Fliegende Holländer CD (2002), Teldec Classics
Berlioz: La Révolution Grecque CD (2004), EMI Classics
Italian Opera Arias CD (2004), Virgin Classics
Gounod & Massenet Arias CD (2005), Virgin Classics
Tristan und Isolde CDs and DVD (2005), EMI Classics
Don Carlo 2 DVDs (2005), Opus Arte
La Traviata CD (2005), Deutsche Grammophon
Merry Christmas (Soundtrack) CD (2005), Virgin Classics
Opera Recital CD; bonus edition with DVD (2006), Virgin Classics
La Traviata DVD; premium 2-DVD edition (behind the scenes, rehearsals, introduction to the opera etc.) (2006), Salzburger Festspiele 2005, Deutsche Grammophon
La Bohème DVD (2006), Bregenzer Festspiele 2002, ORF + Capriccio
Monteverdi: Il Combattimento CD; bonus edition with DVD (2006), Virgin Classics
Donizetti: L'elisir d'amore DVD (2006), Virgin Classics
The Berlin Concert: Live from the Waldbühne DVD (2006), Deutsche Grammophon
Gitano CD; bonus edition with DVD (February 2007), Virgin Classics
Duets featuring Rolando Villazón and Anna Netrebko CD; bonus edition with DVD (March 2007), Deutsche Grammophon
Viva Villazón – Rolando Villazón – Best-of-CD (2007), Virgin Classics
La Bohème Live recording CD (two disk set) (2008), Deutsche Grammophon
Cielo e Mar CD (2008), Deutsche Grammophon
Romeo et Juliette 2 DVDs (Salzburger Festspiele 2008) (2009), Deutsche Grammophon
Georg Friedrich Händel CD/CD+DVD,(2009) Deutsche Grammophon
La Bohème DVD (2009)
¡México! 2010
Vivaldi: Ercole sul Termodonte with Fabio Biondi and Europa Galante, CD (2010), Erato
La Strada - Songs from the movies CD (2011), Deutsche Grammophon
Don Giovanni CD (2012), Deutsche Grammophon
Villazón Verdi CD (2012), Deutsche Grammophon
Werther CD (2012), Deutsche Grammophon
Cosi fan tutte CD (2013), Deutsche Grammophon
L'elisir d'amore DVD (2014), Deutsche Grammophon
Die Entführung aus dem Serail CD (2015), Deutsche Grammophon
Treasures of Belcanto CD (2015), Deutsche Grammophon
Messiah CD (2016) with the Mormon Tabernacle Choir and Orchestra at Temple Square
Le Nozze di Figaro CD (2016), Deutsche Grammophon
O Come Little Children (2017)
Duets CD (2017), Deutsche Grammophon
La Clemenza di Tito CD (2018), Deutsche Grammophon
Feliz Navidad CD (2018), Deutsche Grammophon
Die Zauberflöte CD (2019), Deutsche Grammophon
Serenata Latina CD (2020), Deutsche Grammophon

References

External links

Official page on Deutsche Grammophon 

1972 births
Living people
People from Naucalpan
EMI Classics and Virgin Classics artists
Mexican operatic tenors
20th-century Mexican male opera singers
21st-century Mexican male opera singers
Deutsche Grammophon artists
Operalia, The World Opera Competition prize-winners
Chevaliers of the Ordre des Arts et des Lettres
Singers from Mexico City
Mexican emigrants to France
Naturalized citizens of France
Pataphysicians
Opera directors